Jennifer Marie Morrison is an American actress, director, producer, and former child model. She is mainly known for her roles as Dr. Allison Cameron in the medical-drama series House (2004–2012) and Emma Swan in the ABC adventure-fantasy series Once Upon a Time (2011–2018). She has also portrayed Zoey Pierson, one of Ted Mosby's love interests, on the comedy series How I Met Your Mother, Winona Kirk, mother of James T. Kirk in the 2009 science-fiction film Star Trek, and Tess Conlon in the 2011 sports drama film Warrior. She made her feature-film directorial debut with Sun Dogs (2017).

Early life
Morrison was born in Chicago, Illinois, and grew up in Arlington Heights, Illinois. She is the oldest of three children; her sister, Julia, is a singer-songwriter and music band therapist, and her brother, Daniel, is a high-school band director. Her father, David, is a retired music teacher and high-school band director who was named Teacher of the Year by the Illinois State Board of Education in 2003.

Morrison attended South Middle School, and then graduated from Prospect High School (where her parents worked) in 1997. She was an All-State clarinet player in the school's marching band, sang in the choir, and was a cheerleader in the school pep squad. She attended Loyola University Chicago, where she majored in theatre and minored in English, graduating in 2000. She studied at the Steppenwolf Theatre Company before moving to Los Angeles to pursue a career in acting.

Career

Beginnings and film roles (1992–2010)

Morrison started her career as a child model, appearing in print advertisements for JCPenney and Montgomery Ward, and commercials for Rice Krispies and Mondo. She was featured on the cover of Sports Illustrated for Kids with basketball star Michael Jordan in May 1992. Morrison made her feature-film debut at the age of 14 in the 1994 film Intersection, and later appeared as Samantha in Stir of Echoes (1999). Morrison's first leading role came in the 2000 film Urban Legends: Final Cut, and she has since gone on to appear in films including Grind (2003), Surviving Christmas (2004), and Mr. & Mrs. Smith (2005).

In 2004, Morrison won the role of immunologist Dr. Allison Cameron on House. She played the role for the first six seasons of the show, from 2004 to 2009. Morrison's character left in the 2009 episode "Teamwork", but returned in the 2010 episode "Lockdown" to conclude Cameron's story. Morrison returned for the series finale "Everybody Dies" in 2012. In 2006, Morrison starred in and produced the independent film Flourish. She is also one of the producers who found Glee during its early draft and brought it to attention of writer Ryan Murphy, who adapted it into a television series. Morrison did not stay involved creatively, but is credited as an associate producer on the first season for her involvement in finding it and helping it get into the right hands.

In 2007, Morrison appeared as Kirce James in the computer game Command & Conquer 3: Tiberium Wars, a character who frequently interacts with the player during the course of the GDI campaign. Her film projects that year included Big Stan and The Murder of Princess Diana, a television film based on the book of the same name by Noel Botham. Produced by Lifetime and Working Title Television, Morrison portrays an American journalist who witnesses the car crash that took the life of Diana, Princess of Wales. In 2009, Morrison returned to the big screen, appearing in the opening scene of J. J. Abrams' Star Trek reboot as James T. Kirk's mother, Winona. After her contract on House was not renewed, it was announced in December 2009 that Morrison had won the role of Kate Keller, Helen Keller's mother, in the Broadway-bound revival of The Miracle Worker.

Once Upon A Time and television (2011–present)

In the fall of 2010, Morrison appeared as a guest star in the fourth episode of NBC's Chase. She played the role of Faith, a single mother-turned-fugitive, who embarks on a bloody killing spree across Texas with her little daughter. She then joined the cast of CBS's How I Met Your Mother as recurring character Zoey Pierson, a mischievous architecture nerd and love interest of main character Ted Mosby's, and "the biggest female character we've maybe ever added to the show in Ted's life", according to executive producer Craig Thomas.

In 2011, Morrison appeared in Warrior, a film about two estranged brothers who enter a mixed martial arts tournament and are forced to confront their struggling relationship with each other and with their father. Morrison plays the wife of Joel Edgerton's character, struggling to keep her family together. Starting in October 2011, Morrison had a starring role in ABC's Once Upon a Time. She played the role of Emma Swan, a bail-bonds collector who turns out to be the daughter of Snow White and Prince Charming.

In April 2016, Morrison launched her own film production company, Apartment 3C Productions, named after the apartment she shared with her friends during her time at Loyola University Chicago. She directed her first feature film, Sun Dogs, under this label during the summer of 2016. In December 2017, Netflix announced it had acquired worldwide streaming rights to the film.

In March 2017, it was announced that Morrison was cast as Stephanie in an off-Broadway revival of the play The End of Longing. The performance lasted from May 18 to July 1, 2017. On May 8, 2017, Morrison announced via social media that she would not be returning to Once Upon a Time as a series regular for season seven, while also noting that she had agreed to return as a guest for one episode. That episode was the season's second, which aired in October 2017. However, she ultimately returned for the series finale, which aired in May 2018.

Morrison co-starred in Amityville: The Awakening as Candice. Originally shot in 2014, the film was released on Google Play on October 12, 2017, with a limited theatrical release on October 28, 2017. In 2017, she made her feature film directorial debut with Sun Dogs, starring Michael Angarano, Melissa Benoist, and Allison Janney. In June 2019, Morrison was confirmed to join the cast of This Is Us in a recurring role for the fourth season as Cassidy Sharp, an alcoholic and Marine veteran grappling with her return to civilian life. She returned to guest star in season 5 and 6.

Personal life
Morrison began a relationship with her House co-star Jesse Spencer in 2004. Spencer proposed to Morrison at the Eiffel Tower on December 23, 2006, but in August 2007, they called off their engagement. Morrison started dating Prison Break actor Amaury Nolasco in 2009; the relationship reportedly lasted three years. From 2012 to 2013 Morrison dated actor Sebastian Stan. As of 2019 Morrison has been in a relationship with Gerardo Celasco.

Filmography

Film

Television

Director

Music videos

Video games

Theatre

References

External links

 
 
 
 
 

Living people
20th-century American actresses
21st-century American actresses
Actresses from Chicago
American child actresses
American child models
Female models from Illinois
American stage actresses
American people of Irish descent 
American film actresses
American television actresses
Loyola University Chicago alumni
People from Arlington Heights, Illinois
Year of birth missing (living people)